VAST (Video Ad Serving Template) is a specification defined and released by the Interactive Advertising Bureau (IAB) that sets a standard for communication requirements between ad servers and video players in order to present video ads.

It is a data structure declared using XML.

VAST has 8 versions: 1.0 (deprecated), 1.1 (deprecated), 2.0, 2.0.1(The schema version as the official VAST 2.0 schema), 2.6, 3.0, 4.0, 4.1 and 4.2.

Request
In order to play a video ad in a video player, the video player sends a request to a VAST ad server.

It is a simple HTTP based URL that typically appears as follows:
http://www.example.com/?LR_PUBLISHER_ID=1331&LR_CAMPAIGN_ID=229&LR_SCHEMA=vast2-vpaid

Response
The ad server responds with a VAST data structure that declares these parameters:
 The ad media that should be played
 How the ad media should be played
 What should be tracked as the media is played
 The companion ad that should be displayed alongside the master ad

For example, the above request returns the following response (trimmed):
 <?xml version="1.0" encoding="utf-8"?>
 <VAST version="2.0">
    <Ad id="229">
    	<InLine>
    		<AdSystem version="4.9.0-10">LiveRail</AdSystem>
    		<AdTitle><![CDATA[LiveRail creative 1]]></AdTitle>
    		<Description><![CDATA[]]></Description>
    		<Impression id="LR"><![CDATA[http://t4.liverail.com/?metric=impression&cofl=0&pos=0&coid=135&pid=1331&nid=1331&oid=229&olid=2291331&cid=331&tpcid=&vid=&amid=&cc=default&pp=&vv=&tt=&sg=&tsg=&pmu=0&pau=0&psz=0&ctx=&tctx=&coty=0&adt=0&scen=&url=http%3A%2F%2Fwww.longtailvideo.com%2Fsupport%2Fopen-video-ads%2F23120%2Fwhat-is-vast%2F&cb=1259.192.118.68.5.0.690&ver=1&w=&wy=&x=121&y=121&xy=0b79&z2=0]]></Impression>
 			.......
 		    <Creatives>
 			    <Creative sequence="1" id="331">
            		<Linear>
            			<Duration>00:00:09</Duration>
 	                    <TrackingEvents>
        	                <Tracking event="firstQuartile"><![CDATA[http://t4.liverail.com/?metric=view25&pos=0&coid=135&pid=1331&nid=1331&oid=229&olid=2291331&cid=331&tpcid=&vid=&amid=&cc=default&pp=&vv=&tt=&sg=&tsg=&pmu=0&pau=0&psz=0&ctx=&tctx=&coty=0&adt=0&scen=&url=http%3A%2F%2Fwww.longtailvideo.com%2Fsupport%2Fopen-video-ads%2F23120%2Fwhat-is-vast%2F&cb=1259.192.118.68.5.0.690&ver=1&w=&wy=&x=&y=&xy=]]></Tracking>
                            <Tracking event="midpoint"><![CDATA[http://t4.liverail.com/?metric=view50&pos=0&coid=135&pid=1331&nid=1331&oid=229&olid=2291331&cid=331&tpcid=&vid=&amid=&cc=default&pp=&vv=&tt=&sg=&tsg=&pmu=0&pau=0&psz=0&ctx=&tctx=&coty=0&adt=0&scen=&url=http%3A%2F%2Fwww.longtailvideo.com%2Fsupport%2Fopen-video-ads%2F23120%2Fwhat-is-vast%2F&cb=1259.192.118.68.5.0.690&ver=1&w=&wy=&x=&y=&xy=]]></Tracking>
                           	.......
                        </TrackingEvents>         
                        <VideoClicks>
            		     	<ClickThrough><![CDATA[http://t4.liverail.com/?metric=clickthru&pos=0&coid=135&pid=1331&nid=1331&oid=229&olid=2291331&cid=331&tpcid=&vid=&amid=&cc=default&pp=&vv=&tt=&sg=&tsg=&pmu=0&pau=0&psz=0&ctx=&tctx=&coty=0&adt=0&scen=&url=http%3A%2F%2Fwww.longtailvideo.com%2Fsupport%2Fopen-video-ads%2F23120%2Fwhat-is-vast%2F&cb=1259.192.118.68.5.0.690&ver=1&w=&wy=&x=&y=&xy=&redirect=http%3A%2F%2Fliverail.com%2F]]></ClickThrough>
            			</VideoClicks>
                        <MediaFiles>
        				    <MediaFile delivery="progressive" bitrate="256" width="480" height="352" type="video/x-flv"><![CDATA[http://cdn.liverail.com/adasset4/1331/229/331/lo.flv]]></MediaFile>
        				    ......
    				    </MediaFiles>
    				    ......
    				</Linear>
    			</Creative>
    		</Creatives>
    	</InLine>
    </Ad>
 </VAST>

References

See also 
 Interactive Advertising Bureau

Online advertising methods
XML-based standards